Presidential elections were held in Ecuador in 1892. The result was a victory for Luis Cordero Crespo, who received 97% of the vote. He took office on 1 September.

Results

References

Presidential elections in Ecuador
Ecuador
1892 in Ecuador
Election and referendum articles with incomplete results